Pseudagrion rufocinctum is a species of damselfly in the family Coenagrionidae. It is found in the Democratic Republic of the Congo, Tanzania, and Uganda. Its natural habitats are subtropical or tropical moist lowland forests and freshwater springs. It is threatened by habitat loss.

References

Coenagrionidae
Insects described in 1956
Taxonomy articles created by Polbot